The Path of Totality is the tenth studio album by American nu metal band Korn. It was released on December 2, 2011 in Europe and December 6, 2011 in the US. The album was produced by various electronic music producers such as Skrillex, Noisia, Excision and various other independent producers. "Get Up!", is one of three tracks produced by Skrillex, and was released as a digital download on May 6, 2011. "Narcissistic Cannibal" was released as the second single on October 18, 2011.

Regarding the album, vocalist Jonathan Davis stated: "I want to trail-blaze. I want to change things. I want to do things we're not supposed to do. I want to create art that's different and not conform to what's going on. We didn't make a dubstep album. We made a Korn album." The album was made available for pre-order on Amazon and iTunes on October 21, 2011; as well as special bundle packages available on Korn.com.

Revolver named The Path of Totality album of the year in their 100th issue. Korn was also inducted into the Kerrang! Hall of Fame during the 2011 Kerrang! Awards.

Background
The album features production by Skrillex, Datsik, Feed Me, Excision, 12th Planet, Downlink, Kill the Noise, and Noisia. Monti, and Datsik contributed to the mixing process. The band recorded The Path of Totality with electronic producers back in Davis' home studio in Bakersfield during inspired sessions. It was revealed by Jonathan Davis that vocals were actually tracked in the singer's home theater or in closets and hotels everywhere from Korea to Japan.

Music and lyrical themes
The Path of Totality is claimed by the band to be a fusion of their traditional sound with dubstep and drum and bass. Korn collaborated with a number of producers for the album with each producing their own individual tracks. Roadrunner released the following statement: 

Korn frontman Jonathan Davis describes the new album as "very well-rounded, with a mix of mellow, upbeat tracks; possibly the most well-proportioned Korn album of all time." In a new biography on Roadrunner Records' official website, Jonathan Davis declares The Path of Totality as "future metal". "We're mixing metal and electro music, and you're not supposed to do that. Since day one, Korn has always been all about going against the grain, experimenting, and trying to take music different places."

Album title and packaging
The album title was revealed as The Path of Totality. "The title The Path of Totality refers to the fact that in order to see the sun in a full solar eclipse, you must be in the exact right place in the exact right time," says Jonathan Davis, explaining the story behind the name. "That's how this album came together. I think all the producers feel the same way. I'm not sure it could ever happen again."

Munky stated; "I wanted to come up with a name that felt otherworldly," Shaffer explained. "A shadow is cast on the earth when a solar eclipse occurs. The moon has to be perfectly aligned with the sun to create this flawless shadow that completely covers the sun from the earth. Similarly, all of the producers and writers had to come together at the perfect time to cast these songs onto tape."

The album is a standard 11-track album, with the deluxe edition featuring extra songs and The Encounter as a bonus DVD. The band's website also offered special pre-order packages that include a Path of Totality T-shirt and signed lithograph as well as the CD/DVD deluxe combo. Hot Topic offered a signed lithograph with pre-orders for a limited time.

Promotion

Korn commenced a world tour to promote the album named The Path of Totality Tour, which offers special VIP packages. "Get Up!" was released as a promotional single, becoming a top ten hit on Billboard's Mainstream Rock Songs chart and would be featured in the soundtrack for EA Sports video game Madden NFL 12. The digital single has sold over 200,000 downloads in the US according to Nielsen SoundScan. A lyric video for the single was released on YouTube which accumulated over 3 million views and more than 35,000 likes. The second single, "Narcissistic Cannibal", was released to radio stations and digital music outlets on October 18 and 24, respectively; a music video was filmed in Hollywood by ShadowMachine (Moral Orel, Robot Chicken). A number of new songs have been added to the tour's setlist, including "Kill Mercy Within", "My Wall", and "Way Too Far". "Narcissistic Cannibal" leaked onto YouTube on October 11. It was later released for free download on Korn's official website as a WAV file. A lyric video was also released on both Korn's official YouTube channel and Roadrunner's channel as well. It has since accumulated more than 461,000 views and 6,200 likes. Hot Topic premiered a new track, "Sanctuary", on November 16. Roadrunner Records and Korn started streaming the album in full on December 1, as well as offering lead single "Get Up!" as a free download. "Way Too Far" and "Chaos Lives in Everything" were released as the album's third and fourth singles, respectively.

Critical reception

The album received polarized reviews. Rock Sound gave the album an 8/10 rating, remarking that "It may not be perfect, but Korn have thrown caution to the wind and set out an impressive template for a future sound, for a band doing that nearly 20 years into their career, they deserve your respect". They do note however that the album sounds "a little formulaic" and "monotonous" at times. Spin gave the album a 7/10, saying "Thing is, dubstep's slithering textures actually suit Davis' demented croon". Henry Northmore from The List gave the album a rating of 4/5 saying that "the purists (both metal and dubstep) will probably hate it, but if you are willing to have your brain assaulted from every direction by a new Frankensteinian metal/beats hybrid, you'll find an album packed with pure adrenaline". AllMusic gave the album 4/5 saying that "despite all the electronics, there's no mistaking The Path of Totality as a Korn album...and one of their better ones to boot".

Alistair Lawrence from BBC Music criticized the album saying that "once the novelty of the squelching, space-aged din they've birthed fades, what's apparent is how little Korn have to say for themselves these days". Sputnikmusic strongly criticized the album giving it a score of 0.5/5 stating that "The Path Of Totality is a truly horrible album, built on a foundation of tired and overwrought stereotypes put together not by just a clueless band, but a bunch of equally confused artists who truly have no proper understanding of the genre they claim to be a part of". No Ripcord gave the album a 1/10 stating that "it is samey, ugly and spectacularly stupid at the same time". Jason Heller from The A.V. Club gave the album an 'F', stating: "To Korn's credit, The Path Of Totality is its most radical reinvention to date. It's also the worst slab of sludge it ever shat."NME gave the album a 6/10 saying that it's "not quite a car crash, but a near miss" and jokingly asking: "What do you do when you're 10 albums into your career, sliding down festival bills and trying to bury the tag of creators of a genre you now despise? If you're Korn, you Google '2011 music' and rope in a bunch of DJs for a 'dubstep' album, of course".
On April 11, 2012, The Path of Totality won "Album of the Year" at the 2012 Revolver Golden Gods Awards. This was Korn's first ever win at the Golden Gods Awards.

Track listing

 
 
 The special edition DVD features the complete Korn Live: The Encounter performance.

Personnel

Korn
 Jonathan Davis – lead vocals
 James "Munky" Shaffer – guitars, backing vocals
 Reginald "Fieldy" Arvizu – bass, additional guitars
 Ray Luzier – drums, percussion

Production and additional music 

 Skrillex ("Chaos Lives in Everything", "Narcissistic Cannibal" and "Get Up!")
 Datsik ("Tension")
 Feed Me ("Bleeding Out")
 Excision ("My Wall", "Illuminati" and "Tension")
 12th Planet ("Way Too Far")
 Downlink ("Illuminati", "Sanctuary" and "Tension")
 Kill the Noise ("Narcissistic Cannibal" and "Fuels the Comedy")
 Noisia ("Kill Mercy Within", "Burn the Obedient" and "Let's Go")
 Jonathan Davis – executive producer, additional production ("Sanctuary")
 Jim Monti – engineering, mixing, additional production
 Downlink – mixing
 Datsik – mixing ("Tension")
 Ted Jensen – mastering at Sterling Sound, NYC
 ROBOTO – cover design
 Edward O'Dowd – package design

Commercial performance
The Path of Totality sold 55,000 copies in its first week to debut at number 10 on the Billboard 200, making it Korn's eleventh album to peak within the top 10. The album has sold 270,000 copies in the US as of January 4, 2013 according to Nielsen SoundScan.

Weekly charts

Year-end charts

Singles

References

2011 albums
Korn albums
Roadrunner Records albums